Adel Lami Khalid Mohamed (born November 13, 1985) is a Qatari footballer who is a midfielder .

Career
Lami was born in Al Magwa, Kuwait. He began playing football on the streets in his neighbourhood, until he joined the youth ranks of Kuwait SC. During that period, he was coached by Abdulkarim Al Aqas. When he was 14 years old, he went to Qatar to play for Al-Rayyan. He advanced through the junior teams of Al Rayyan, until he made his senior debut in 2001, coming on against Al Shamal and making an assist.

International career
He is a member of the Qatar national football team.

Notes 

1985 births
Living people
Qatari footballers
Al-Rayyan SC players
Umm Salal SC players
Lekhwiya SC players
Al Kharaitiyat SC players
Al-Gharafa SC players
Al-Arabi SC (Qatar) players
Muaither SC players
2007 AFC Asian Cup players
Qatar Stars League players
Naturalised citizens of Qatar
Kuwaiti emigrants to Qatar
Asian Games medalists in football
Footballers at the 2006 Asian Games
Asian Games gold medalists for Qatar
Association football midfielders
Medalists at the 2006 Asian Games
Qatari people of Kuwaiti descent
Qatar international footballers